Father of the House is a title that has been traditionally bestowed, unofficially, on certain members of some legislatures, most notably the House of Commons in the United Kingdom. In some legislatures the title refers to the longest continuously-serving member, while in others it refers to the oldest member. Recently, the title Mother of the House or Mother of Parliament has also been used, although the usage varies between countries; it is either the female alternative to Father of the House, being applied when the relevant member is a woman, or refers to the oldest or longest-serving woman without reference to male members.

United Kingdom

The Father of the House is a title that is bestowed on the senior member of the House of Commons who has the longest continuous service. If two or more members have the same length of current uninterrupted service, then whoever was sworn in earlier, as listed in Hansard, is named as Father of the House. Traditionally, however, the qualifications used for the Father of the House are not entirely clear and may have included the oldest member, the member with the longest aggregate service, or the member who entered the House longest ago.

The only formal duty of the Father of the House is to preside over the election of the Speaker of the House of Commons. The Father of the House may also participate in ceremonial events, and is the second member to be sworn in after the Speaker. At the election of the Speaker and dissolution of parliament in November 2019, the Father of the House of Commons was Kenneth Clarke representing the Rushcliffe constituency, formerly a member of the Conservative Party before becoming an Independent MP in 2019, and not standing again in the subsequent election. Clarke began his continuous service at the 1970 general election. Dennis Skinner, Labour MP for Bolsover, also began continuous service at the 1970 general election, but was sworn in minutes after Clarke.

The first recorded usage of the title dates back to 1816 an engraved portrait of Whitshed Keene by Charles Picart, dated 1 February. Henry Campbell-Bannerman was simultaneously Father of the House and Prime Minister from May 1907 until soon before his death during April 1908. On 13 June 2017, Harriet Harman was dubbed "Mother of the House" by Prime Minister Theresa May, in recognition of her status as the longest-continuously-serving woman MP.

Australia

The titles "Father of the House" and "Father of the Senate" are sometimes used to refer to the members of each chamber of the Parliament of Australia with the longest continuous service. The current Father of the House is Bob Katter (MP since 1993) and the current Father of the Senate is Marise Payne (senator since 1997).

According to House of Representatives Practice, the title Father of the House is a "completely informal designation" with "no functions attached to it". The equivalent publication for the Senate, Odgers' Australian Senate Practice, describes the title Father of the Senate as "now seldom referred to or used". It also notes that "as no woman senator has ever been in this situation, it is not clear what the title would be in that circumstance".

Canada

The longest-serving member of the House of Commons who is not a cabinet minister is known as the Dean of the House, and presides over the election of the Speaker at the beginning of each Parliament. As of September 2021, the current Dean of the House is Bloc Québécois MP Louis Plamondon, who was first elected to the Commons as a member of the Progressive Conservative Party in 1984.

Czech Republic
In the Chamber of Deputies, if previous President of the Chamber of Deputies or his deputies are not elected, the oldest MP serves as the Acting President presiding over the constitutive session, before new President is elected.
 1993: Robert Dostál — Czech Social Democratic Party
 1996: Zdeněk Jičínský — Czech Social Democratic Party
1998: Augustin Bubník — Civic Democratic Party
 2002: Břetislav Petr — Czech Social Democratic Party
 2003: Zdeněk Jičínský — Czech Social Democratic Party
 2010: Karel Schwarzenberg — TOP 09
 2021: Bohuslav Svoboda —  Civic Democratic Party

In the Senate, if  previous President of the Senate or his deputies are not elected for the next term, the oldest Senator serves as the Acting President presiding over the opening session gathered every two years, before election of the new President.
 1996:  Jaroslav Musial — Czech Social Democratic Party
2000: Jaroslava Moserová — Civic Democratic Alliance
 2004: Bedřich Moldan — Civic Democratic Party
 2010: Jiří Dienstbier — Czech Social Democratic Party
 2011: Pavel Lebeda — Czech Social Democratic Party
 2014: František Čuba — Party of Civic Rights
 2018: Jaroslav Malý — Czech Social Democratic Party
 2020:  Jaroslav Doubrava — Severočeši.cz
 2022: Jan Pirk – TOP 09

European Parliament

Until 2009, the oldest member of the European Parliament presided over the opening of a new session and the election of the President of the European Parliament.

Finland

Germany
Starting with the Frankfurter Nationalversammlung (Frankfurt Parliament) of 1848, all German parliaments had a father of the House, usually called Alterspräsident (President by right of age). This tradition was continued into the Weimar Republic and, after being discontinued in Nazi Germany, was resumed by the present Parliament (Bundestag) in the Federal Republic, whose rules of procedure mandate that the father of the house presides over the Parliament (Bundestag) at the start of each legislative period.

In accordance with tradition, the Alterspräsident first ascertains himself that he is indeed the oldest member of the Bundestag by stating his date of birth and asking if anyone is present, who was born before this date. If no older member of the Bundestag is present he will formally declare that he indeed is the Alterspräsident and will start proceedings. (In 2017, as explained below, the position was changed to refer to the longest sitting member. Prospective Alterspräsident state the number of years served in the Bundestag and asks if anyone has served more years.)

The Alterspräsident then delivers the first programmatic speech and supervises the election of the President of the Bundestag, to whom he then immediately yields his power. The newly elected president will in turn supervise the elections of the Vice Presidents of the Bundestag.

The rules of order of the Bundestag also state that the Alterspräsident shall preside over sessions of the Bundestag at any given time during a legislative period, if the whole Presidium (i.e. the President and the Vice Presidents of the Bundestag) is altogether unable to perform its duties.

As the Alterspräsidents opening speech usually draws a certain amount of public attention, the position has recently attracted controversy, when the Party of Democratic Socialism (the successor of the Socialist Unity Party of Germany) obtained the position by including aged independents (Stefan Heym in 1994, Fred Gebhardt in 1998) in their party lists. In 2017, the Bundestag changed its rules of procedure to have the member with the longest service in the Bundestag serve as father of the house, rather than the oldest member.

Hong Kong

In Hong Kong, there is no such term as "Father of the House". Instead, the longest-serving member was termed the Senior Unofficial Member and was the highest-ranking unofficial member of the Executive Council and the Legislative Council until the title was abolished in 1995 and 1992 respectively.

After the handover of Hong Kong, the member of the Legislative Council with the highest order of precedence, determined according to the length of continuous service in the Council, was tasked with presiding over the election of President of the Council, until 2017.

 Hungary 
In Hungary, the term  (President by the age) refers to the oldest member of the National Assembly (previously House of Representatives, the lower house). Before the open session, the senior chairperson and junior notaries review the mandates of all the elected MPs in addition to their own. He or she presides over the newly elected parliament until the appointment of the officials.

It is also worth mentioning that József Madarász who was Father of the House from 1892 to his death in 1915 at the age of 100, was also member of the Parliament from 1848 (whenever it was convened) and prior to that he was emissary of the Hungarian Diet, the predecessor of Parliament in Hungary, from 1832. Thus making him the longest serving member of Parliament in Hungary at a record of 82 years.

 Israel 
In the beginning of some Knessets, the oldest member assumes temporary duties of the speaker before the election of a permanent speaker,  In the past it was the oldest member of Knesset, now it is the longest-serving member. The oldest member of the 24th Knesset is Benny Begin.

Ireland

In the Republic of Ireland, the term Father of the Dáil''' is an unofficial title applied to the longest-serving Teachta Dála (TD) in Dáil Éireann. The current Fathers of the Dáil are Richard Bruton and Willie O'Dea having both been first elected to the Dáil in the February 1982 general election. On a number of occasions, two or more people have shared the position of Father of the Dáil.

Malaysia

In Malaysia the term "Father of the House" is rarely used. Tengku Razaleigh Hamzah who was elected during 1974, has been the longest-serving MP in the Dewan Rakyat. Both of them ended their long serving in the Dewan Rakyat after being defeated in 2022 Malaysian general election. As of 2022, Muhyiddin Yassin took in place as he served from 1978 to 1986 and continued from 1995 until now.

New Zealand

In New Zealand, the term "Father of the House" (alternatively, "Mother of the House"), as an unofficial title, designates the longest-continuously-serving MP of the House of Representatives. The Father of the House has no official role in Parliament. The current Father and Mother of the House are Gerry Brownlee and Nanaia Mahuta, respectively, who have both served continuously since .

Russia
Traditionally when a new Russian parliament is formed the eldest deputy opens and manages the first session until a chairman is elected. In the history of the post-Soviet Dumas these were:
 1993 Georgy Lukava – Liberal Democratic Party
 1995 Grigory Galaziy – Our Home – Russia
 1999 Yegor Ligachyov – Communist Party
 2003 Valentin Varennikov – Rodina
 2007 Zhores Alferov – Communist Party
 2011 Vladimir Dolgikh – United Russia
 2016 Zhores Alferov – Communist Party
 2021 Valentina Tereshkova – United Russia

Serbia
In the National Assembly of the Republic of Serbia, the oldest MP serves as the Acting Speaker presiding over the constitutive session, before the Speaker is elected.
 2001: Zaharije Trnavčević — Democratic Party
 2004: Velimir Simonović — Democratic Party of Serbia
 2007: Borka Vučić — Socialist Party of Serbia
 2008: Jovan Krkobabić — Party of United Pensioners of Serbia
 2012: Zaharije Trnavčević — Rich Serbia
 2014: Milan Korać — Party of United Pensioners of Serbia
 2016: Dragoljub Mićunović — Democratic Party
 2020: Smilja Tišma — Independent
 2022: Vladeta Janković —  Independent

Singapore
Until his death on 23 March 2015, former Prime Minister Lee Kuan Yew was the longest-serving Member of Parliament (Tanjong Pagar) and thus the Father of the House. , Emeritus Senior Minister and former pm Goh Chok Tong later became Father of the House, as the longest-serving MP (Marine Parade). Upon Goh's retirement in 2020, Prime Minister Lee Hsien Loong is Father of the House having served since 1984.

Sweden
In Sweden the Riksdagsordningen law states that the member of the Riksdag who has held their elected seat for the longest shall be the Ålderspresident, which translates to President by age''. The Ålderspresident acts as speaker of the Riksdag after each election, before the Speaker of the Riksdag has been elected. The Ålderspresident also acts as speaker in case of hindrance on behalf of the Speaker and all three Deputy Speakers.

Members of the Riksdag who has held the position of Ålderspresident since the abolition of bicameralism:
 Tage Erlander (first elected 1932) 1971–1973
 Torsten Nilsson (first elected 1941) 1973–1976
 Henry Allard (first elected 1945) 1976–1979
 Gunnar Sträng (first elected 1946) 1979–1985
 Ingemund Bengtsson (first elected 1951) 1985–1988
 Stig Alemyr (first elected 1957) 1988–1994
 Ingvar Carlsson (first elected 1965) 1994–1996
 Börje Nilsson (first elected 1965) 1996–1998
 Jan Bergqvist (first elected 1969) 1998–2002
 Anders Björck (first elected 1969) 2002–2003
 Bo Lundgren (first elected 1976) 2003–2004
 Lennart Nilsson (first elected 1976) 2004–2006
 Per Westerberg (first elected 1979) 2006–2014
 Göran Hägglund (first elected 1991) 2014–2015
 Krister Örnfjäder (first elected 1993) 2015–2018
 Beatrice Ask (first elected 1988) 2018–2019
 Tuve Skånberg (first elected 1991) 2020–2022
 Carina Ohlsson (first elected 1998) 2022
 Karin Enström (first elected 1998) 2022
 Tomas Eneroth (first elected 1994) 2022–present

United States
In the United States, the title "Father" of the House (although used for about a century starting in 1816) does not exist, but in the lower house, the House of Representatives the position known as Dean of the House is almost exactly the same position—that is, it is a largely ceremonial position bestowed on the member with the longest continuous service.  Less similar is the position in the Senate (the upper house) known as President Pro Tempore, the holder of which has since 1945 gained the position through seniority, but who also must be a member of the party holding a majority in the Senate.

Since March 2022, with the death of Don Young, the Dean of the House has been Hal Rogers, who was elected to the House of Representatives in 1980 and began serving in 1981.

See also
 Oldest Member (European Parliament)
 Baby of the House
 Dean of the House (Canada)
 Dean of the U.S. House of Representatives
 Father of the Dáil
 List of longest-serving members of the Australian House of Representatives
 President pro tempore of the United States Senate
 Senior Marshal (Poland)

References

External links
 Father of the House: House of Commons Background Paper, House of Commons Library, 2016

Westminster system
Senior legislators